Nicky Case is a genderqueer Canadian indie game developer best known for developing video games such as Coming Out Simulator and Parable of the Polygons, both released in 2014. Case's most recent game, Adventures with Anxiety was released in 2019. Adventures with Anxiety is an interactive choose-your-own-adventure narrative game. Case's works are characterised by their interactive design and the recurring goal to “.. help people understand complex systems.” Besides designing and developing games, Case is active on their website and blog, regularly updating posts, short stories and comics about mental health, games and media culture, and recently, COVID-19 safety. They also post blogs teaching others math, how to code and how to make games.

Personal life 
Case is non-binary and has chosen to be referred to in gender-neutral terms, expressing a lack of preference for pronouns. They were born in Singapore and moved with their family to Vancouver when they were young.

Career 
Case began their journey into game design at a young age through the creation of various independent flash games on the platform Newgrounds. One of their games broke out and became viral, in part due to the popular internet personality Markiplier playing the game for his YouTube channel. This success helped Case get an internship at Electronic Arts (EA), their first entry into the gaming industry. About their experience at EA Case stated that the company was queer friendly, more so than usual in the field, but that the way projects could fall through any moment inspired them to become independent.

First independent projects and Coming Out Simulator 2014 

Through a crowdfunding platform, Case funded their first independent project Nothing To Hide. During the project, however, Case worked on a few side projects that turned out to be more successful than the game itself. The first was an instructional tutorial on how the shadows worked in the game, and the second was a submission for the Nar8 Game Jam4 for which they made Coming Out Simulator 2014. Coming Out Simulator, which told their personal story about coming out to their parents as bisexual and the consequences thereof. Though, as opposed to reality, the game had multiple endings, depending on the choices by the player. The response to the game was very positive. It was nominated to the Independent Games Festival's 2015 edition in the Excellence in Narrative category. and Case even received emails from queer individuals who related to and felt seen by the game. These side steps were the first foray into interactive and exploratory design.

Parable of the Polygons 

The shadow explainer also achieved success and reached the front page of the image website Imgur, and Case was approached by interaction designer Bret Victor to join a workshop where they met Vihart, another educative YouTuber with a focus on math. This led to a collaboration project named Parable of Polygons, an interactive explainer about bias and discrimination. It received overwhelmingly positive critical reception, with Salon's Joanna Rothkopf calling it  "an adorable and eloquent primer on the issues of segregation".

With the success of the shadow explainer, Parable of Polygons and following interactive games, Nicky Case began to truly build their name as an interactive designer. It became their mission “to explore the yet vastly under-explored medium of interactivity.” And they began to help others with this pursuit as well by setting up Explorable Explanations, a platform where others could make and publish interactive explainers of all types and educational fields.

Adventures with Anxiety 
Nicky Case's latest full release took a slight step away from system based gameplay, back to the more narrative interactivity of Coming Out Simulator 2014. Adventures with Anxiety represents Case's own struggles with accepting and coping with anxiety disorder. The game's intent was to help teach players how to have a better relationship with themselves as well as with other people. In an interview with Storybench, Case explains that games are their format of choice, just like a musician uses song to express themselves. For Case, they "could use the choices in the game to force the player to reflect on, and express, their own deepest fears and then create a healthier relationship with those fears."

Adventures with Anxiety is public domain, and the webpage of the game features the full source code for free. Case explains that they benefited greatly from the public open source codes of others when they started out making games. They want to pay it forward and stimulate others to make games as well.

Other works 
Case released Nothing to Hide, a stealth game prototype, in 2013. The crowdfunded surveillance/privacy-themed video game prototype was crowdfunded and opened under CC0 on GitHub between 2013 and 2015.

In 2016, Case released We Become What We Behold. Created in just two months, the game forces the player to continuously report on the most interesting news, causing confusion and anger. We Become What We Behold reflects on how the media and news cycles shape our experience of reality.

2017 saw the release of The Evolution of Trust, an interactive guide to the game theory of how and why people trust each other.

During the COVID-19 pandemic, Case has also released an explainer about the spread of COVID-19 and how they interact with lockdown measures, and an awareness comic about the use and need for contact tracing apps that are surveillance free.

References

External links

Canadian video game designers
People with non-binary gender identities
Indie video game developers
Year of birth missing (living people)
Living people